TP9 may refer to:
Brügger & Thomet MP9
 TP9: an EEG electrode site according to the 10-20 system